The 1912 Michigan Agricultural Aggies football team represented Michigan Agricultural College (MAC) as an independent during the 1912 college football season. In their second year under head coach John Macklin, the Aggies compiled a 7–1 record and outscored their opponents 297 to 98.

Schedule

Game summaries

Michigan

On October 12, 1912, the Aggies lost to Michigan by a 55 to 7 score at Ferry Field. It was the seventh game in the Michigan - Michigan State football rivalry, and Michigan had a 5–0–1 record in the six prior meetings, outscoring the Aggies by a combined total of 225 to 6. The Aggies took a 7-0 lead in the first quarter on an 85-yard interception return by left end Blake Miller.  The touchdown was the first ever scored by a Michigan Aggies team against Michigan.  Michigan tied the score in the second quarter and added 48 points in the second half.  Michigan scored eight touchdowns in the game. The game was played in 15-minute quarters.

References

Michigan Agricultural
Michigan State Spartans football seasons
Michigan Agricultural Aggies football